Xysticus emertoni, or Emerton's crab spider, is a species of crab spider in the family Thomisidae. It is found in the United States, Canada, Slovakia, Russia, and a range from Central Asia to China.

References

Thomisidae
Articles created by Qbugbot
Spiders described in 1880